Enrique González Delgado (born 19 May 1964) is a Mexican equestrian. He competed in show jumping at the 2008 Summer Olympics and the 2020 Summer Olympics.

References

External links
 

1964 births
Living people
Mexican male equestrians
Olympic equestrians of Mexico
Equestrians at the 2008 Summer Olympics
Equestrians at the 2011 Pan American Games
Equestrians at the 2019 Pan American Games
Sportspeople from Mexico City
Pan American Games competitors for Mexico
Equestrians at the 2020 Summer Olympics
Pan American Games medalists in equestrian
Pan American Games silver medalists for Mexico
Medalists at the 2019 Pan American Games
21st-century Mexican people